Pae is a village in Lääne-Harju Parish, Harju County in northern Estonia. The population was 105 as of 2011.

References 

Villages in Harju County
Kreis Harrien